The Peruvian Episcopal Conference is an episcopal conference of the Roman Catholic Church of Peru that gathers the bishops of the country in order to discuss pastoral issues and in general all matters that have to do with the Church. 

The following are members of the Conference:
 The diocesan bishops and others considered such de jure;
 The coadjutor bishops;
 The auxiliary bishops;
 The titular bishops by appointment of the Holy See or the Conference itself;

Guests of the Conference are the Apostolic Nuncio and other bishops (titular and emeritus).

Secretary General
Fortunato Urcey, Prelate of Chota (2014-2017)

See also
 Roman Catholicism in Peru

References

External links
 Conferencia Episcopal Peruana - Official website (in Spanish).

Catholic Church in Peru
Peru